John Arnold Seitz CMG (19 September 1883 – 1 May 1963) was an Australian cricketer and educationist. He played ten first-class cricket matches for Victoria from 1910–11 to 1912–13. He also played for Oxford University in 1909.

See also
 List of Victoria first-class cricketers
 List of Oxford University Cricket Club players

References

External links
 
 Arnold Seitz at CricketArchive
 Andrew Spaull, "Seitz, John Arnold (1883–1963)" at Australian Dictionary of Biography

1883 births
1963 deaths
People educated at Scotch College, Melbourne
University of Melbourne alumni
Australian Rhodes Scholars
Alumni of Merton College, Oxford
Australian cricketers
Oxford University cricketers
Victoria cricketers
Cricketers from Melbourne
Australian educational theorists
Australian Companions of the Order of St Michael and St George